Préludes pour piano (Preludes for piano) is an early work for piano by the French composer Olivier Messiaen composed in 1928–1929, when the composer was 20 years old. Messiaen considered it to be his first work of any value. The composition is based on Messiaen's modes of limited transposition, and betrays an influence of Debussy's preludes.

The pieces were premiered by the composer in a private performance at the Concerts Durand which took place on January 28, 1930. The first public performance was given by Henriette Puig-Roget on March 1, 1930, at the Salle Érard at the Société Nationale de Musique in Paris.

Movements 
The work is in eight movements, each accompanied by a description consisting mostly of the associated colors. It takes about 34 minutes to play in full.

References

1928 compositions
1929 compositions
Compositions by Olivier Messiaen
Compositions for solo piano
Preludes (music)